John Patrick Shanley (born October 13, 1950)  is an American playwright, screenwriter, and director. He won the 1988 Academy Award for Best Original Screenplay for the film Moonstruck. His play, Doubt: A Parable, won the 2005 Pulitzer Prize for Drama and the 2005 Tony Award for Best Play; he wrote and directed the film adaptation and earned a nomination for the Academy Award for Best Adapted Screenplay.

Early life and education
Shanley was born into an Irish-American family in The Bronx, New York City. His mother worked as a telephone operator, and his father was a meat-packer.  The neighborhood Shanley grew up in was considered very rough.

Shanley's academic career did not begin well, but ultimately he graduated from New York University with honors.  In his program bio for the Broadway production of Doubt: A Parable, he mentions that he was "thrown out of St. Helena's kindergarten, banned from St. Anthony's hot lunch program and expelled from Cardinal Spellman High School." He was heavily influenced by one of his first teachers, Sister Margaret McEntee, on whom he based the character of Sister James in his play, Doubt. While at Cardinal Spellman High School, he saw two school productions that influenced him: The Miracle Worker and Cyrano de Bergerac.

After his freshman year at New York University, Shanley was put on academic probation.  He then enlisted in the United States Marine Corps, serving in a stateside post during the Vietnam War. Following his military service, he wrote a novel, then burned it, and returned to the university with the help of the G.I. Bill, and by supporting himself with a series of jobs: elevator operator, house painter, furniture mover, locksmith, bartender.  He graduated from New York University as valedictorian in 1977, with a degree in Educational Theatre, and is a member of the Ensemble Studio Theatre.

Career

Shanley is the author of more than 23 plays, which have been translated and performed around the world, including 80 productions a year in North America.  He has often directed his own productions.

He has also written for film; his second film, Moonstruck (1987), stars Nicolas Cage and Cher, and won three Academy Awards, including one for his screenplay. In 1990, Shanley directed his script of Joe Versus the Volcano. Shanley also wrote two songs for the movie: "Marooned Without You" and "The Cowboy Song." He wrote the screenplay for the film Congo (1995), which was based on the Michael Crichton book.

His play Doubt: A Parable ran on Broadway from March 31, 2005, to July 2, 2006, and won four 2005 Tony Awards (including Best Play), the Drama Desk Award (including Outstanding Play) and the Pulitzer Prize for Drama. Shanley directed the 2008 film version, which starred Meryl Streep, Philip Seymour Hoffman, Amy Adams and Viola Davis. The screenplay was nominated for an Academy Award, and the Writers Guild of America Award for Best Adapted Screenplay.Doubt: A Parable, is featured in The Fourth Wall, a book of photographs by Amy Arbus for which Shanley also wrote the foreword.

In 2012, Shanley wrote the libretto for an opera version of Doubt: A Parable, which premiered at the Minnesota Opera in January 2013, with music by Douglas J. Cuomo. Until then, his experience with opera was not extensive; he had attended a few performances and had listened to recordings.  As he worked on the libretto, using many lines that come directly from the play, he describes that his enthusiasm for the form grew. Also in 2012, his play Storefront Church ran Off-Broadway in a production by the Atlantic Theater Company. The play concerns Bronx residents "whose lives become tangled in unexpected ways when a mortgage goes sour". Storefront Church was also put up by San Francisco Playhouse in San Francisco in December 2013 where it was very well received.

His play, Outside Mullingar, opened on Broadway at the Samuel J. Friedman Theatre, produced by the Manhattan Theatre Club, on January 3, 2014 (in previews) and officially on January 23, 2014.  The play was directed by Doug Hughes and starred Debra Messing and Brían F. O'Byrne. The play is set in the Irish countryside.

Prodigal Son, which he directed, was produced Off-Broadway by the Manhattan Theatre Club. It opened on February 9, 2016, and featured Timothée Chalamet, Robert Sean Leonard, Annika Boras, Chris McGarry and David Potters. The play concerns a lonely teen from The Bronx who attends a private school in New Hampshire. His new play The Portuguese Kid opened on October 24, 2017, at the New York City Center Stage I, produced by the Manhattan Theatre Club. Directed by Shanley, the cast featured Jason Alexander, Sherie Rene Scott, Mary Testa, Aimee Carrero and Pico Alexander.

Personal life
Shanley resides in New York City. He has been married and divorced twice; with his second wife, Jayne Haynes, he adopted two sons, both born in 1992.

Work

Theatre

Film

Television

Awards, nominations, and honors
In 2002 Shanley was inducted into the Bronx Walk of Fame.

Awards
1988 Academy Award for Best Original Screenplay – Moonstruck
1988 Writers Guild of America Award for Best Original Screenplay – Moonstruck
2005 Drama Desk Award for Outstanding Play – Doubt: A Parable
2005 Pulitzer Prize for Drama – Doubt: A Parable
2005 Tony Award for Best Play – Doubt: A Parable
2005 Lucille Lortel Award for Outstanding Play – Doubt: A Parable
2005 Obie Award for Playwriting – Doubt: A Parable

Nominations
1988 Golden Globe Award for Best Screenplay – Moonstruck
1989 BAFTA Film Award for BAFTA Award for Best Original Screenplay – Moonstruck
2003 Primetime Emmy Award for Outstanding Writing for a Miniseries, Movie, or Dramatic Special – Live from Baghdad
2005 Drama Desk Award for Outstanding Play – Sailor's Song
2009 Academy Award for Best Adapted Screenplay – Doubt
2009 Golden Globe Award for Best Screenplay – Doubt
2009 Broadcast Film Critics Association Award for Best Writer – Doubt
2009 Writers Guild of America Award for Best Adapted Screenplay – Doubt
2014 Tony Award for Best Play – Outside Mullingar

References

External links
 
 
 
 
 John Patrick Shanley profile in The New York Times Magazine
 MovieMaker
 A Re-'Doubt'-able Effort: A Cultural Conversation with John Patrick Shanley in "The Wall Street Journal"

1950 births
Living people
20th-century American dramatists and playwrights
20th-century American male writers
20th-century American screenwriters
21st-century American dramatists and playwrights
21st-century American male writers
21st-century American screenwriters
American male dramatists and playwrights
American male screenwriters
American opera librettists
American people of Irish descent
American writers of Irish descent
Best Original Screenplay Academy Award winners
Cardinal Spellman High School (New York City) alumni
Drama Desk Award winners
Film directors from New York City
Military personnel from New York City
Obie Award recipients
Pulitzer Prize for Drama winners
Screenwriters from New York (state)
Steinhardt School of Culture, Education, and Human Development alumni
Tony Award winners
United States Marines
Writers from the Bronx
Writers Guild of America Award winners